CXH may refer to:

Charing Cross Hospital in London, UK
China Xinhua Airlines, the ICAO airline code
Vancouver Harbour Water Airport, the IATA airport code
Chloe x Halle, American R&B duo
 Chuzhou railway station, China Railway telegraph code CXH